The Free Slave is a live album by drummer Roy Brooks recorded in 1970 and released on the Muse label in 1972. It was the third album released on the label.

Reception
The Free Slave, according to Jim Dulzo in JazzTimes in 2003, "catches a live 1970 set with a band of stellar hard boppers that includes a very young Woody Shaw, plus George Coleman, Hugh Lawson and Cecil McBee. McBee and Brooks lay down a funky, intelligent groove and the band burns brightly through four extended tunes."

Track listing 
All compositions by Roy Brooks except as indicated
 "The Free Slave" - 12:18   
 "Understanding" - 10:57   
 "Will Pan's Walk" (Cecil McBee) - 9:07   
 "Five for Max" - 13:40

Personnel 
Roy Brooks - drums
Woody Shaw - trumpet
George Coleman - tenor saxophone
Hugh Lawson - piano
Cecil McBee - bass

References 

Roy Brooks albums
1972 live albums
Muse Records live albums